Pichon Longueville, the archaic name of a Bordeaux wine producer refers in present-day to:

Château Pichon Longueville Baron, or Pichon Baron
Château Pichon Longueville Comtesse de Lalande or Pichon Comtesse, or Pichon Lalande

Monuments historiques of Gironde